Chandra Prakash Joshi is an Indian politician and a member of parliament to the 16th Lok Sabha from Chittorgarh (Lok Sabha constituency), Rajasthan. He is also the state President of the Bhartiya Janta Party youth wing (Bjym), Rajasthan. He won the 2014 Indian general election being a Bharatiya Janata Party candidate.

In 2019, He again won the 2019 Indian general election being a Bharatiya Janata Party candidate from Chittorgarh Lok Sabha.

Current Position
He worked as a President of Bhartiya Janta Yuva Morcha, Rajasthan. Currently, he is a State Vice President of Bhartiya Janta Party Rajasthan,

References

https://india.gov.in/my-government/indian-parliament/chandra-prakash-joshi

External links 
 Election analytics of Chandra Prakash Joshi

1975 births
Living people
India MPs 2014–2019
India MPs 2019–present
Bharatiya Janata Party politicians from Rajasthan
Lok Sabha members from Rajasthan
People from Chittorgarh district